A playing card is one of a set of cards used for playing games.

Playing card may also refer to:

The Playing-Card, a quarterly publication about card games
Playing Cards (film), an 1896 silent film
Playing Cards (Unicode block)

See also
Standard 52-card deck, the most common set of playing cards
Pinocle#Deck
Playing cards in Unicode
List of playing-card nicknames
Archaeology awareness playing cards
Most-wanted Iraqi playing cards